A by-election was held for the New South Wales Legislative Assembly electorate of Carcoar on 21 November 1884 because of the death of Andrew Lynch.

Dates

Candidates
 Ezekiel Baker had been the member for Carcoar from 1880 until 1881 and was Secretary for Mines when he was expelled from the Assembly on allegations of bribery and corruption in relation to the affairs of the Milburn Creek Copper Mining Co. Ltd.  He was defeated at the subsequent by-election in December 1881. Charges against him were subsequently dropped and Baker petitioned parliament to rescind its censure of him, which was agreed in May 1884.

Thomas Fitzpatrick was a squatter from Junee, who was an unsuccessful candidate at the 1882 election.

Charles Garland was an assurance agent and miner, who had interests in mines in Leadville and on the Palmer River in Far North Queensland. He was also the proprietor of the Carcoar Chronicle, and Baker accused Garland of vilifying him in that paper in relation to the Milburn Creek case.

Fitzpatrick won the show of hands however a poll was demanded.

Result

				

Andrew Lynch died.

See also
Electoral results for the district of Carcoar
List of New South Wales state by-elections

References

1884 elections in Australia
New South Wales state by-elections
1880s in New South Wales